Jonathan Erlich and Andy Ram were the defending champions, but Paul Hanley and Kevin Ullyett defeated them 7–6(7–4), 7–6(7–2), in the final.

Seeds

  Mark Knowles /  Daniel Nestor (first round)
  Paul Hanley /  Kevin Ullyett (champions)
  Martin Damm /  Leander Paes (first round)
  Fabrice Santoro /  Nenad Zimonjić (quarterfinals)

Draw

Draw

External links
 2006 ABN AMRO World Tennis Tournament Draw

Doubles
2006 ATP Tour